Tony Labat (born 1951) is a Cuban-born multimedia and installation artist. He has exhibited internationally over the last 40 years, developing a body of work in performance, Video, sculpture and Installation.  Labat's work has dealt with investigations of the body, popular culture, identity, urban relations, politics, and the media. His work is included in the collection of the Museum of Modern Art, New York.

Early life and education
Labat was born in Havana, Cuba in 1951. He emigrated from Cuba to Miami, Florida when he was fifteen. He received his BFA (1978) and his MFA (1980) from the San Francisco Art Institute, where he has taught since 1985.

Exhibitions
In 2005 Labat had a survey exhibition of his work in conjunction with the publication of "Trust Me." Other exhibitions include:
“I Want You,” San Francisco Museum of Art, San Francisco, CA
"Tony Labat and Ignacio Lang," at Harris/Lieberman Gallery, New York, NY  
"I Like To Watch," The Canal Chapter, New York, NY
"Xtreme Sparring," El Museo del Barrio, New York, NY  
Gallery Paule Anglim, San Francisco, CA  
"Time and Transition in Contemporary Cuban Art," Mestna Galerija, Ljubljana, Slovenia
"Mata Crush," Havana Bienal, Havana, Cuba; 
"Trading Places," Gallery Hit, Bratislava, Slovakia, Check Republic 
"Mapping the Outside: (Fat Chance Bruce Nauman)," Seville Bienal, Seville, Spain
"Mayami: Between Cut and Action," Centre Georges Pompidou, Paris, France 
"Moving Target," Helsinki City Art Museum, Helsinki 
"Random Topography," NoD Gallery, Prague, Czech Republic 
"Performance Anxiety," UC Berkeley Art Museum, Berkeley, CA
"Tony Labat: Four Installations," Museum of Contemporary Art (MOCA), Los Angeles, CA

References 

Cuban artists
San Francisco Art Institute alumni
1951 births
Living people
Artists from San Francisco
Body art
American video artists
American performance artists
American conceptual artists